Thomas Taylour may refer to:

Thomas Taylour, 1st Earl of Bective (1724–1795), Irish MP for Kells 1747–1760
Thomas Taylour, 1st Marquess of Headfort (1757–1829), his son, Irish MP for Kells 1776–1790, Longford Borough and Meath
Thomas Taylour, 2nd Marquess of Headfort (1787–1870), his son, Lord-in-Waiting and Lord Lieutenant of Cavan
Thomas Taylour, 3rd Marquess of Headfort (1822–1894), British MP for Westmorland 1854–1870, Lord Lieutenant of Meath
Thomas Taylour, Earl of Bective (1894–1943), British MP for Westmorland 1871–1885 and Kendal

See also
Thomas Taylor (disambiguation)
Thomas le Tayleur, MP for Wycombe (UK Parliament constituency)